The 2002 Eastern Michigan Eagles football team represented Eastern Michigan University in the 2002 NCAA Division I-A football season. In their third season under head coach Jeff Woodruff, the Eagles compiled a 3–9 record (1–7 against conference opponents), finished in last place in the West Division of the Mid-American Conference, and were outscored by their opponents 566 to 286. The team's statistical leaders included Troy Edwards with 2,762 passing yards, Ime Akpan with 1,221 rushing yards, and Kevin Walter with 1,368 receiving yards.

Schedule

Roster

References

Eastern Michigan
Eastern Michigan Eagles football seasons
Eastern Michigan Eagles football